Robert Julien Hoffstetter (11 June 1908 in Fargniers – 29 December 1999 in Gennevilliers) was a French taxonomist and herpetologist who was influential in categorizing reptiles. He described the snake families Bolyeriidae and Madtsoiidae.

Selected bibliography
Faune du gisement précolombien d'Anse-Belleville: Reptiles, 1946
Les mammifères pléistocènes de la république de l'Equateur, 1952 
Notice sur les titres et travaux scientifiques, 1955
Contribution à l'étude des Orophodontoidea, gravigrades cuirassés de la Patagonie, 1956
Le gisement de ternifine, 1963
Historique et géologie, 1963
Révision des Artiodactyles de l'Eocène moyen de Lissieu (Rhône), 1972
Rongeurs caviomorphes de l'Oligocène de Bolivie, 1976
Phylogenie et Paleobiogeographie, 1982

References 

French herpetologists
French taxonomists
~
1908 births
1999 deaths
20th-century French zoologists
People from Aisne